This article contains the discography of American R&B singer Ginuwine. This includes studio albums, compilation albums, and singles. Ginuwine has sold 21 million albums in the US.

Albums

Studio albums

Collaboration albums

Compilation albums

Singles

As lead artist

As featured artist

Notes
1 Not released in the U.S.
2 Airplay chart in the U.S.

Other guest appearances

Music videos

References

Discographies of American artists
Rhythm and blues discographies